Ali Turap Bülbül (born 25 January 2005) is a Turkish professional footballer currently playing as a right-back for Galatasaray.

Club career
Born in Düzce, Bülbül joined the academy of Galatasaray in 2016. Having progressed through the youth ranks, he was taken on the team's pre-season tour of Austria in 2022, featuring in a number of friendlies.

International career
Bülbül has represented Turkey at youth international level.

References

External links
 

2005 births
Living people
People from Düzce
Turkish footballers
Turkey youth international footballers
Association football defenders
Galatasaray S.K. footballers